Events in the year 1883 in Germany.

Incumbents

National level
 Kaiser – William I
 Chancellor – Otto von Bismarck

State level

Kingdoms
 King of Bavaria – Ludwig II of Bavaria
 King of Prussia – Kaiser William I
 King of Saxony – Albert of Saxony
 King of Württemberg – Charles I of Württemberg

Grand Duchies
 Grand Duke of Baden – Frederick I
 Grand Duke of Hesse – Louis IV
 Grand Duke of Mecklenburg-Schwerin – Frederick Francis II
 Grand Duke of Mecklenburg-Strelitz – Frederick William
 Grand Duke of Oldenburg – Peter II
 Grand Duke of Saxe-Weimar-Eisenach – Charles Alexander

Principalities
 Schaumburg-Lippe – Adolf I, Prince of Schaumburg-Lippe
 Schwarzburg-Rudolstadt – George Albert, Prince of Schwarzburg-Rudolstadt
 Schwarzburg-Sondershausen – Charles Gonthier, Prince of Schwarzburg-Sondershausen
 Principality of Lippe – Woldemar, Prince of Lippe
 Reuss Elder Line – Heinrich XXII, Prince Reuss of Greiz
 Reuss Younger Line – Heinrich XIV, Prince Reuss Younger Line
 Waldeck and Pyrmont – George Victor, Prince of Waldeck and Pyrmont

Duchies
 Duke of Anhalt – Frederick I, Duke of Anhalt
 Duke of Brunswick – William, Duke of Brunswick
 Duke of Saxe-Altenburg – Ernst I, Duke of Saxe-Altenburg
 Duke of Saxe-Coburg and Gotha – Ernst II, Duke of Saxe-Coburg and Gotha
 Duke of Saxe-Meiningen – Georg II, Duke of Saxe-Meiningen

Events
 12 May – A German merchant Adolf Lüderitz purchases and takes possession of land in South-West Africa, which subsequently forms the basis of the first German colony of German South-West Africa (Deutsch-Südwestafrika).

Undated
 German company AEG is founded in Berlin.
 Germany gets the world's first national social health insurance system by legislation of Otto von Bismarck's social legislation, which included the Health Insurance Bill of 1883.
 The Schotten-Baumann reaction is first described in 1883 by German chemists Carl Schotten and Eugen Baumann.
 The Suermondt-Ludwig-Museum in Aachen is opened.

Births

 12 January – Gustav Otto, aircraft engineer (died 1926)
 19 January – Hermann Abendroth, German conductor (died 1956)
 31 January – Hermann Höpker-Aschoff, German judge and politician (died 1954)
 16 February – Conrad Hommel, German painter (died 1971)
 9 February – Fritz August Breuhaus, German architect, interior designer and designer (died 1960)
 23 February – Otto Nuschke, German politician (died 1957)
 23 February – Karl Jaspers, German psychiatrist and philosopher (died 1969)
 8 March – Adolf Köster, German diplomat and politician (died 1930)
 13 March – Eugen Ritter von Schobert, German general (died 1941)
 18 May – Walter Gropius, German architect (died 1969)
 18 May – Theodor Loos, German actor (died 1954)
 7 July – Prince Eitel Friedrich of Prussia, German nobleman (died 1942)
 10 July – Johannes Blaskowitz, German general (died 1948)
 10 July – Friedrich Flick, German entrepreneur and industrialist (died 1972)
 7 August – Joachim Ringelnatz, German writer (died 1934)
 20 August – Robert Lehr, German politician (died 1956)
 11 September – Emil Rausch, German swimmer (died 1954)
 17 September – Käthe Kruse, notable pioneer of German doll-making (died 1968)
 14 September – Martin Dibelius, German academic theologian and New Testament professor at the University of Heidelberg (died 1947)
 24 September – Wilhelm Stählin, German Lutheran theologian, bishop, preacher (died 1975)
 30 September – Bernhard Rust, Education Minister of Nazi Germany (died 1945)
 8 October – Otto Heinrich Warburg, German physiologist, medical doctor and Nobel laureate (died 1970)
 25 October – Walter Alfred Rosam, German painter (died 1916)
 15 November – Günther Rüdel, German general (died 1950)

Deaths

 19 January – Georg Ferdinand Howaldt, German sculptor (born 1802)
 21 January – Prince Charles of Prussia, German nobleman and Prussian general (born 1801)
 24 January – Friedrich von Flotow, German composer (born 1812)
 13 February – Richard Wagner, German composer (born 1813)
 27 February – Julius Stern, German composer and pedagogue (born 1820)
 14 March – Karl Marx, German philosopher, economist, historian, political theorist, sociologist, journalist and revolutionary socialist (born 1818)
 15 April – Frederick Francis II, Grand Duke of Mecklenburg-Schwerin (born 1823)
 29 April – Franz Hermann Schulze-Delitzsch, German economist and politician (born 1808)
 4 August – August Howaldt, German engineer and ship builder (born 1809)
 19 November – Arnold Schaefer, German historian (born 1819)

References

 
Years of the 19th century in Germany